Merlin (also known as The Adventures of Merlin) is a British fantasy-adventure drama television programme, loosely based on the Arthurian legends regarding the close relations of Merlin and King Arthur. Created by Julian Jones, Jake Michie, Johnny Capps and Julian Murphy for the BBC, it was broadcast for five series on BBC One between 20 September 2008 and 24 December 2012. The programme starred Colin Morgan, Bradley James, Katie McGrath, Angel Coulby, Richard Wilson, Anthony Head, and John Hurt.

The programme is a reimagining of the legend, in which young warlock Merlin is sent to the kingdom of Camelot by his mother because of his "special gift". After saving Prince Arthur's life in the first episode, he becomes Arthur's manservant. Merlin soon learns that the reason for his gift is to protect Arthur, but Merlin must hide his powers because magic was banned in Camelot by Arthur's father, King Uther Pendragon, and those caught practising it are executed. Over the years and after several adventures together, Merlin and Arthur become trusted friends and companions, with the former doing his best to influence the latter into becoming the king he is destined to be.

Merlin was nominated for several awards, winning the 2011 British Academy Television Award for best visual effects. Broadcasting rights were sold to over 180 countries.

Series overview 
Merlin (Colin Morgan) is a young, powerful warlock who arrives in the kingdom of Camelot after his mother arranges for him to stay with the court physician, Gaius (Richard Wilson). He discovers that the king, Uther Pendragon (Anthony Head), outlawed magic twenty years earlier in an event known as the Great Purge and imprisoned the last dragon, Kilgharrah (voice of John Hurt), in the caves beneath the castle. After hearing a mysterious voice inside his head, Merlin makes his way to the cavern beneath the keep to find that he was hearing the dragon's voice. The Great Dragon tells Merlin that he has an important destiny: to protect Uther's only son, Prince Arthur (Bradley James), who will return magic to Camelot and unite the land of Albion.

When Merlin meets Arthur, Merlin considers him to be an arrogant bully, and Arthur, likewise, is less than impressed with Merlin. After saving the prince's life, Merlin is appointed as his personal manservant. The two experience many adventures, over the course of which they come to respect and trust one another. But when Uther's actions eventually cause his ward, Morgana (Katie McGrath), to turn against Camelot and pursue a path of evil, Merlin and Arthur must join forces with friends, old and new, to protect their home and secure their destinies.

Cast 

 Colin Morgan as Merlin, Arthur's servant and Gaius' ward, who secretly develops his magical gifts under the gaze of kings Uther and Arthur, both of whom despise the art. Only Gaius and Lancelot are aware of his magic. Merlin also has an alter-ego, "Dragoon the Great" (conjured when Merlin performs an aging spell upon himself), who is considered a criminal by Uther and Arthur, and inspires profound fear in Morgana who recognises him as Emrys, her prophetic nemesis. Despite keeping his capabilities under wraps for years, by the end of the show, more people become aware of Merlin's powers, including Mordred, Agravaine, Morgana, Gwen, and Arthur.
 Bradley James as Arthur Pendragon, the Prince and later King of Camelot, and the commander of the kingdom's knights. Despite being charged with carrying out his father's harsh edicts, Arthur is portrayed as a far more compassionate man, who defends the falsely accused before the king, and occasionally defies him. Arthur welcomes commoners Lancelot, Gwaine, Elyan, Mordred, and Percival as knights, and falls in love with Gwen, a serving girl, whom he later marries and makes Queen. He comes to regard his servant Merlin as a close friend and confidant, never realising how many times Merlin has had to save his life using magic. Arthur initially promises to lift Uther's ban on magic when he becomes king, but changes his mind when he thinks magic killed his father. Arthur is prophesied as "The Once and Future King", which means, even though he is killed in the final episode, Arthur Pendragon will rise again.
 Angel Coulby as Guinevere ("Gwen"), Morgana's servant who later becomes Queen of Camelot. Her relationship with Arthur at first causes conflict within the kingdom, as Uther considers her unworthy due to her low status and forbids Arthur to court her, even accusing her of witchcraft when Arthur's affections for her do not diminish. However, Gwen proves popular among the common people, and strives to make Arthur and his advisers approachable to them. Gwen is brave and selfless, always doing what's right for Arthur and Camelot.
 Katie McGrath as Morgana Pendragon, Uther's ward who is later revealed to be his daughter. Initially a kind and empathetic young woman, Morgana comes to despise Uther for his prejudice against magic and when she realizes he would never accept her if he knew of her magical powers, she begins covertly plotting against him. She becomes the show's primary villain by the third series, coveting Arthur's throne.
 Anthony Head as Uther Pendragon, Camelot's stubborn king, who shows Arthur repeated tough love and ruthlessly enforces the kingdom's strict ban on sorcery. Although meaning well, Uther earns himself many enemies in his brutal fight against magic, and Morgana's ultimate betrayal leaves him a broken man.
 Richard Wilson as Gaius, the court physician and Merlin's surrogate father and mentor. Once a sorcerer himself, Gaius abandoned the practice but occasionally practises it when Merlin needs help. A wise man with a long memory, Gaius is one of Uther's closest advisers, and always among the first to realise what is really happening when magic threatens the kingdom.
 Nathaniel Parker as Agravaine de Bois (series 4), Arthur's uncle who steps in, reputedly as a trusted adviser to Arthur, but is later identified as a traitor. Merlin and Gaius learn quickly that Agravaine's loyalty is to Morgana.
 John Hurt as the voice of the Great Dragon, also known as Kilgharrah, the last of his kind after Uther destroys all of his kin and makes an example of him by imprisoning him in a vast cave beneath the castle. The Great Dragon gives Merlin advice and forges the sword of Excalibur in his breath for Arthur, but persistently demands his freedom in return. Merlin eventually releases him, unwittingly unleashing a full-on assault on Camelot by the dragon, seeking revenge for his murdered kin. However, Merlin learns from his father that he is descended from a long line of dragonlords, and is able to use that power to control the Great Dragon. Subsequently, Merlin and the dragon become close friends with the dragon often helping Merlin when needed.

Character appearances 
{| class="wikitable" style="text-align:center;"
|-
! rowspan="2" style="width:210px;" | Character !! style="width:150px;" rowspan="2"| Portrayed by !! colspan="5"| Series
|-
! style="width:80px;"| Series 1(2008) !! style="width:80px;"| Series 2(2009) !! style="width:80px;"| Series 3(2010) !! style="width:80px;"| Series 4(2011) !! style="width:80p;| Series 5(2012)
|-
! Merlin
| Colin Morgan
| colspan="5" 
|-
! Arthur Pendragon
| Bradley James
| colspan=5 
|-
! Guinevere
| Angel Coulby
| colspan=5 
|-
! Morgana Pendragon
| Katie McGrath
| colspan=5 
|-
! Uther Pendragon
| Anthony Head
| colspan=4 
| colspan=1 
|-
! Gaius
| Richard Wilson
| colspan=5 
|-
! Agravaine de Bois
| Nathaniel Parker
| colspan=3 
| colspan=1 
| colspan=1 
|-
! colspan="7" style="background:lightgrey;"| Recurring
|-
! The Great Dragon / Kilgharrah
| John Hurt
| colspan="5" 
|-
! Geoffrey of Monmouth
| Michael Cronin
| colspan=4 
| colspan=1 
|-
! Hunith
| Caroline Faber
| colspan=1 
| colspan=2 
| colspan=1 
| colspan=1 
|-
! Nimueh
| Michelle Ryan
| colspan=1 
| colspan=4 
|-
! Tom
| David Durham
| colspan=1 
| colspan=4 
|-
! Sir Gregory
| Gary Oliver
| colspan=1 
| colspan=4 
|-
! Morris
| Ed Coleman
| colspan=1 
| colspan=4 
|-
! Sir Lancelot
| Santiago Cabrera
| colspan=3 
| colspan=1 
| colspan=1 
|-
! rowspan=2 | Mordred
| Asa Butterfield
| colspan=1 
| colspan=1 
| colspan=3 
|-
| Alexander Vlahos
| colspan=4 
| colspan=1 
|-
! Iseldir
| Trevor Sellers
| colspan=1 
| colspan=1 
| colspan=2 
| colspan=1 
|-
! Sidhe Elder
| Michael Jenn
| colspan=1 
| colspan=1 
| colspan=1 
| colspan=2 
|-
! Sir Leon
| Rupert Young
| colspan=1 
| colspan=4 
|-
! Morgause
| Emilia Fox
| colspan=1 
| colspan=2 
| colspan=1 
| colspan=1 
|-
! Ygraine Pendragon
| Alice Patten
| colspan=1 
| colspan=1 
| colspan=1 
| colspan=2 
|-
! Freya
| Laura Donnelly
| colspan=1 
| colspan=2 
| colspan=2 
|-
! Balinor
| John Lynch
| colspan=1 
| colspan=1 
| colspan=2 
| colspan=1 
|-
! Sir Gwaine
| Eoin Macken
| colspan=2 
| colspan=3 
|-
! Sir Elyan
| Adetomiwa Edun
| colspan=2 
| colspan=3 
|-
! Cenred
| Tom Ellis
| colspan=2 
| colspan=1 
| colspan=2 
|-
! Sir Percival
| Tom Hopper
| colspan=2 
| colspan=1 
| colspan=2 
|-
! Audrey
| Zee Asha
| colspan=3 
| colspan=1 
| colspan=1 
|-
! Helios
| Terence Meynard
| colspan=3 
| colspan=1 
| colspan=1 
|-
! Queen Annis
| Lindsay Duncan
| colspan=3 
| colspan=2 
|-
! Alator
| Gary Lewis
| colspan=3 
| colspan=2 
|-
! The Dorchraid
| Maureen Carr
| colspan=3 
| colspan=2 
|-
! Princess Mithian
| Janet Montgomery
| colspan=3 
| colspan=2 
|-
! Beroun
| Barry Aird
| colspan=4 
| colspan=1 
|}

 Episodes 

 Production 

The programme was conceived by Julian Murphy and Johnny Capps. The BBC had been keen on showing a drama based on the character of Merlin for some time. A year before the Shine series was initiated, writer and producer Chris Chibnall had been developing a project aimed at a BBC One Sunday night slot, but this was ultimately not commissioned. The Shine version of the project was put into development in late 2006, commissioned by Controller of BBC One Peter Fincham and BBC Head of Fiction Jane Tranter, with Fincham keen on having more series on his channel which embodied "three generation TV – that's TV you can watch with your grandparents and children. There's not enough of that about."

The series went into production in March 2008, with filming in Wales and France (at the Château de Pierrefonds). Two Kent locations were also used: The Barons Hall and Garden Tower at Penshurst Place, and Chislehurst Caves for the first series. The series was produced by Shine in association with BBC Wales, whose Head of Drama Julie Gardner was executive producer for the BBC. Doctor Who chief writer Russell T Davies had been an important influence on the tone and style of Merlin. CGI special effects for the series were provided by The Mill. The Old English for spells was written by university scholar and medievalist Dr. Mark Faulkner, and later by the script editing team. An initial series of 13 episodes, Merlin began transmission in the UK on 20 September 2008. A trailer was prepared in advance for television, cinemas, and online.

US broadcaster NBC began airing Merlin on 21 June 2009; but, after a decline in viewers, it was moved to cable network Syfy, where it began broadcasting series 2 on 2 April 2010. On 19 September 2009, series 2 began airing on BBC One. On 5 September 2010, BFI Southbank in London previewed Episodes 1 and 2 of series 3 for its September Film Funday programme. A ten-episode fourth series was confirmed on 2 October 2010 (though it was rumoured to air in early 2012, later than its usual slot in autumn) so that it would not clash with the BBC's other primetime drama Doctor Who which would possibly run during the same period. In March 2011, this was revised, and the fourth series was extended to the standard 13 episodes. The fourth series was broadcast in the United States on the Syfy Channel "in early 2012." In UK, the fourth series began on Saturday 1 October 2011.

Capps and Murphy confirmed on 24 July that BBC had commissioned a fifth series. Filming for the fifth series began March 2012 in Pierrefonds, France and near Cardiff, Wales. 13 episodes were ordered. Series 5 started broadcasting on 6 October 2012. On 26 November 2012, it was announced that the series 5 of Merlin would be the last, with a two-part special concluding the series over Christmas.

 Broadcast 
A documentary series called Merlin: Secrets and Magic explains how the series was created. Apart from the initial 50-minute special, which was broadcast directly after the series two premiere, and the first episode, shown first on the Sunday repeat, all new 50-minute episodes were shown after each Merlin episode repeat on Saturday, Sunday, Monday, or Friday evening on BBC Three.

In April 2008, United States broadcasting rights were purchased by NBC, where it was shown on Sundays at 8 pm (EST), starting 21 June 2009. This made it the first British drama in over 30 years to be shown on US network television, as opposed to PBS or cable. The programme moved to Syfy, a cable channel also owned by NBC, for the second series, which premiered on 2 April 2010.
Syfy aired the third series in early 2011, after the conclusion of the initial broadcast on BBC. It was later announced the series would air after WWE SmackDown beginning 7 January 2011 at 10 pm (9 pm Central). The distributor, FremantleMedia Enterprises, also sold broadcast rights to CTV in Canada, Network Ten in Australia and Prime in New Zealand. It aired on Choice TV. The series was broadcast in 183 countries.

 Home media 
Series one and two were released on DVD in the United Kingdom, United States, and Australia. Series three is available in the United Kingdom, and was released in Australia on 4 August 2011. Accompanying box sets are featurettes, video diaries, and commentaries. Behind the Magic, a two-part overview of making Merlin is included with the UK series one box set, while the documentary series, Secrets and Magic, is included with series two. In Australia "The Complete Collection" boxset (23-Discs, Seasons 1–5) was released on 13 May 2015.

 Soundtrack 
A soundtrack for the first two series featuring music from selected episodes was released on the MovieScore Media record label. Merlin composer Robert Lane was nominated for Best Original Score for Television for the 10th annual Movie Music UK Awards (2008), the 8th edition GoldSpirit Awards (2008), and the 5th annual International Film Music Critics Association (IFMCA) Awards (2008). In early October 2012 MovieScore Media released the soundtrack from the third and fourth series along with that from the start of the fifth series.

 In other media 
 Official magazine 
UK publisher Attic Brand Media launched an official magazine for the show in September 2011 featuring articles, puzzles and a comic strip written by Damian Kelleher and drawn by Lee Carey. The monthly magazine cost £3.20 per issue and was distributed in UK newsagents.

 Exhibitions 
 Merlin: The Dragon Tower 
A Merlin attraction was created at Warwick Castle entitled Merlin: The Dragon Tower, which featured a walkthrough, a projection of Kilgharrah the dragon, Merlin from the BBC TV Series Merlin'', or at least a true-to-life wax model-which was created with over 300 measurements—and a catalogue of reference shots of Colin Morgan. Upon seeing his wax work, Morgan said, "Little did I think that when I visited Madame Tussauds as a kid that I would have the honour of having the same fantastic team making a wax figure of myself. It’s truly amazing and I can’t praise their hard work enough in creating such a brilliant life-like me."

The wax model cost £150,000, and the entire castle experience was part of a £3 million investment by the Merlin Entertainment Group to promote the show. The attraction closed in 2014 and is now the site of the Warwick Castle Time Tower.

Games 
The BBC released two small Merlin-themed video games on the BBC website: a tower defense game called 'Camelot Defence', and an adventure puzzle game named 'Quest for the Mortaeus'. In 2012, a 'real-time cooperative' video game adaptation named 'Merlin: The Game' was announced and launched on Facebook. It has since been taken offline.

Awards and nominations 
 2009: International Film Music Critics Association (IFMCA) – Best Original Score for a Television Series (Nom)
 2009: British Academy Film Awards – Best Interactivity (Nom)
 2009: Monte-Carlo Television Festival – Outstanding Actor – Drama Series: Colin Morgan (Nom)
 2009: Monte-Carlo Television Festival – Outstanding Actress – Drama Series: Katie McGrath (Nom)
 2009: 7th Visual Effects Society Awards – Outstanding Matte Paintings in a Broadcast Program or Commercial: For the Mark of Nimueh. For series 1 (Nom)
 2009: TV Quick Awards – Best New Drama (Won)
 2010: TV Quick Awards – Best Family Drama (Nom)
 2010: British Academy Film Awards – Best Visual Effects (Nom)
 2010: British Academy Film Awards – Best Design (Nom)
 2010: British Academy Film Awards – Best Director – Film/Drama (Nom)
 2010: Monte-Carlo Television Festival – Outstanding Actress – Drama Series: Angel Coulby (Nom)
 2010: Monte-Carlo Television Festival – Outstanding Actor – Drama Series: Colin Morgan (Nom)
 2010: Monte-Carlo Television Festival – Outstanding Actor – Drama Series: Bradley James (Nom)
 2011: British Academy Film Awards – Best Visual Effects (Won)
 2011: Monte-Carlo Television Festival – Outstanding Actor – Drama Series: Colin Morgan (Nom)
 2011: Monte-Carlo Television Festival – Outstanding Actress – Drama Series: Katie McGrath (Nom)
 2011: TV Quick Awards – Best Actor: Colin Morgan (Nom)
 2011: TV Quick Awards – Best Family Drama (Nom)
 2012: National Television Awards – Most Popular Drama Series (Nom)
 2012: Royal Television Society – Best Sound: Drama (Nom)
 2012: TRIC Awards – TV Drama Programme of the Year (Nom)
 2012: TV Quick Awards – Best Actor: Colin Morgan (Nom)
 2012: TV Quick Awards – Best Family Drama (Nom)
 2013: SFX Awards – Best Actor: Colin Morgan (Won)
 2013: SFX Awards – Best Actress: Katie McGrath (Nom)
 2013: Academy of Science Fiction, Fantasy & Horror Films – Best Youth-Oriented Series on Television (Nom)
 2013: National Television Awards – Most Popular Male Drama Performance: Colin Morgan (Won)
 2013: National Television Awards – Most Popular Drama (Nom)
 2015: Academy of Science Fiction, Fantasy & Horror Films – Best DVD/Blu-Ray Television Release For "The Complete Series" release (Nom)

References

External links 

 , the official global Merlin site
 
 
 
 
 

 
2000s British drama television series
2000s supernatural television series
2008 British television series debuts
2010s British drama television series
2012 British television series endings
BBC Cymru Wales television shows
BBC television dramas
British adventure television series
British comedy-drama television shows
British fantasy television series
Demons in television
Druidry in fiction
English-language television shows
NBC original programming
Period television series
Television about fairies and sprites
Television about magic
Television series about dragons
Television series about ghosts
Television series based on Arthurian legend
Television series by Endemol
Television series set in the Middle Ages
Television shows adapted into video games
Television shows set in Wales
Witchcraft in television
Wizards in television
Works based on Merlin